Frederick Ducange Gaddum (28 June 1860 – 14 October 1900) was an English cricketer active from 1880 to 1884 who played for Cambridge University and Lancashire. He appeared in eleven first-class matches as a lefthanded batsman who bowled slow left arm orthodox. He scored 87 runs with a highest score of 16 and held nine catches. He took 21 wickets with a best analysis of four for 34.

Gaddum was born in Didsbury (now a suburb of Manchester) and educated at Uppingham, Rugby and St John's College, Cambridge. After graduating from Cambridge he became a merchant in Manchester. He died in Stockport from the result of a bicycle accident.

Notes

1860 births
1900 deaths
English cricketers
Lancashire cricketers
Cambridge University cricketers
People educated at Uppingham School
People educated at Rugby School
Alumni of St John's College, Cambridge
Cycling road incident deaths
Road incident deaths in England